Sir William Ian Ridley Johnston CBE QPM DL (born 1945)  was the Chief Constable of British Transport Police. He became Chief Constable on 1 May 2001 when he succeeded David Williams QPM, who had served as Chief Constable for three and a half years.

Police career

Johnston joined the Metropolitan Police in 1965 and served as Staff Officer to former Metropolitan Police Commissioner, Peter Imbert. In 1982, he graduated from London School of Economics with a first in Social Administration.

Having completed the Senior Command Course at Bramshill, Johnston moved to Kent Constabulary in 1989, where he served as Assistant Chief Constable in charge of first Administration and Supply, and then Operations, before moving back to the Metropolitan Police in 1992 as a Deputy Assistant Commissioner.
In 1994, he was appointed Assistant Commissioner for the South East London area, but in 1999 moved to Assistant Commissioner with responsibility for Territorial Policing in 2000.

In September 2009, Sir Ian retired from the British Transport Police and was succeeded by Andrew Trotter OBE QPM.

Johnston came to media attention having given evidence before the enquiry and following the publication of the Macpherson Report into the murder of Stephen Lawrence. On behalf of the Metropolitan Police, Johnston apologised to the Lawrence family for institutionalised racism; but argued that race can legitimately be used by police as a basis for stop and search. Johnston reiterated this argument in the aftermath of the London Tube bombings in 2005. 

Johnston had been mooted as being the next Commissioner of the Metropolitan Police after the retirement of Sir John Stevens in 2005. Sir John had described Johnston as a "substantial figure" at the Met, and noted that following his departure for British Transport Police Johnston was missed. The role of Commissioner went to Sir Ian Blair.

Later life

After retiring from BTP, Ian Johnston was appointed Director of Security and Resilience at LOCOG, for the London 2012 Olympics, responsible for signing the contract with G4S, which, in July 2012, led to the announcement that British troops would be deployed at the Olympics to cover shortfalls. 

According to an insider from LOCOG talking to Newsnight, "there was inadequate scrutiny", "the management of security at Locog was "thoroughly amateurish and incompetent"", and "It was the wrong strategy, to use only one company", compared with the approach of LOCOG's event services division.

Ian Johnston currently holds the chair (since April 2005) of the Association of Chief Police Officers (ACPO) Crime Business Area, and is chairman of Orpington Rovers Football Club, Bromley.

Awards
In the 1995 New Years Honours list he was awarded the Queen's Police Medal. On 16 June 2001, as part of that year's Queen's Birthday Honours, he was appointed a Commander of the Order of the British Empire "for services to the Police". He was knighted in the 2009 Birthday Honours.
He was Appointed a Deputy Lieutenant for the Borough of Camden on 1 January 2008.

References

English recipients of the Queen's Police Medal
Metropolitan Police recipients of the Queen's Police Medal
Commanders of the Order of the British Empire
British Chief Constables
Assistant Commissioners of Police of the Metropolis
1945 births
Alumni of the London School of Economics
Living people
Knights Bachelor
Deputy Lieutenants of Greater London